Iraqi coup d'état may refer to:
 1936 Iraqi coup d'état, Baqr Sidki took power by a military coup in Iraq
 1941 Iraqi coup d'état, anti-British military coup in Iraq
 1958 Iraqi coup d'état, or 14 July Revolution, marking the overthrow of the Hashemite monarchy established by King Faisal I
 February 1963 Iraqi coup d'état, or Ramadan Revolution, Ba'athist coup against Abd al-Karim Qasim
November 1963 Iraqi coup d'état, Bloodless pro-Nasserist coup against Ba'athists
 1968 Iraqi coup d'état, or 17 July Revolution, bloodless coup led by General Ahmed Hassan al-Bakr
 1996 Iraqi coup d'état attempt